Simeon Bekbulatovich (born Sain-Bulat, ; died 5 January 1616) was a Russian statesman of Tatar origin, descendant of Genghis Khan, who briefly served as a figurehead ruler of Russia.

He was born to a Muslim family and served the Khan of the Khanate of Qasim before converting to Christianity and becoming an aide to Ivan IV of Russia. He participated in the Livonian War as a commander of the main regiment (bol'shoi polk) of the Russian army. In 1575, Ivan pretended to abdicate and named Simeon Velikiy knyaz (often translated as "Grand duke" ) of All Rus', but remained de facto in power and returned to his throne a year later. Subsequently, Simeon became Velikiy knyaz of Tver' and Torzhok (1576–1585). He went blind (or was blinded) in 1595 and was allegedly tonsured as a Christian monk under the monastic name Stefan in 1606.

Biography

The first mention of Simeon in the sources is a reference to a certain Sail-Bulat in the Supplement to the Nikon Chronicle under 1561 as being in the entourage of his aunt, Princess Kochenei, when she married Ivan IV. Our earliest evidence that he was khan of Qasim comes from a statement that the Russian ambassador to Constantinople, Ivan Novosil'tsev, said to the Ottoman Sultan Selim II to that effect in 1570.

In 1575 (either September or October), Ivan IV appointed Simeon as Grand Prince of All Rus' and styled himself merely as "Ivan of Moscow". Historians have a number of opinions concerning why Ivan did this. According to the most popular theory by contemporary diplomat Giles Fletcher, the Elder, Ivan aimed to confiscate the land that belonged to monasteries without attracting the ire of the Church. Simeon issued the decrees of confiscation instead of Ivan, while Ivan pretended to disagree. During his one-year "rule" in the Moscow Kremlin, Simeon married Anastasia Mstislavskaya, the great-great-granddaughter of Ivan III.

In 1576, Simeon stepped down as Grand Prince of All Rus' and was appointed Grand Prince of Tver' and Torzhok. In 1585, Tsar Fedor Ivanovich removed his title as Grand Prince of Tver' and Torzhok and confined him to his estate at Kushalov. In 1595, Simeon went blind. According to Jacques Margeret, Simeon blamed Spanish wine that Boris Godunov sent him for his birthday. When Boris was elected Tsar in 1598, he required those at the court to sign a loyalty oath, which prohibited them from recognizing Simeon as tsar or corresponding with him. False Dmitry I required Simeon to be tonsured at the Kirillo-Belozersky Monastery, where he took the monastic name Stefan on April 3, 1606. When Vasilii Shuiskii was elected tsar, he ordered the elder Stefan taken to the Solovki Monastery on May 29, 1606.

In 1612, as the result of a decree issued by Prince D. M. Pozharskii and "on the advice of all the land" (zemskii sobor), Stefan was returned to the Kirilo-Belozersk Monastery. Under Tsar Mikhail Fedorovich, he returned to Moscow and resided in the Simonov Monastery until he
died in 1616. He was buried in the Simonov Monastery next to his wife, who had died June 7, 1607, after having been veiled as the nun Alexandra.

Ancestry

References

Further reading

|-

16th-century births
1616 deaths
16th-century Russian monarchs
Converts to Eastern Orthodoxy from Islam
Eastern Orthodox monarchs
Russian tsars
Year of birth missing
16th-century monarchs in Europe
16th-century Russian people
17th-century Russian people
Russian blind people
Tatar people
Borjigin
People of the Livonian War
Blind royalty and nobility